Matrix Marauders is a 1990 racing video game. According to Psyclapse, it is a "superfast 3D abstract computer racing game."

Gameplay 
The racing game is set in the future, where the player takes part in a racing challenge, in which they race cars in a speed test to see who can reach the finish-line first. The cars have power ups which can be deployed or fired during the game to aid competitors. There are holes on the tracks which must be jumped over. The screen has an interface that allows the player to lock on to opponents and offers warnings when competitors are encroaching, as well as a navigator that speaks to the player.

Development 
The loading sequences of the game were designed by Jim Bowers, who also designed those of Psygnosis games Obliterator and Infestation. Bowers shaded and blended images from the game to give them a metallic look. The game was released after June 1990.

Reception 
Kultpower gave the Atari ST version a 32%, and the Amiga version a 32% as well. Meanwhile, German magazine Datormagazin gave it a 7/10 while CU Amiga gave it 25%.

References 

1990 video games
Amiga games
Atari ST games
Video games developed in the United Kingdom
Racing video games